The Twelfth Dynasty of ancient Egypt (Dynasty XII) is considered to be the apex of the Middle Kingdom by Egyptologists. It often is combined with the Eleventh, Thirteenth, and Fourteenth dynasties under the group title, Middle Kingdom. Some scholars only consider the 11th and 12th dynasties to be part of the Middle Kingdom.

History
The chronology of the Twelfth Dynasty is the most stable of any period before the New Kingdom. The Turin Royal Canon gives 213 years (1991–1778 BC). Manetho stated that it was based in Thebes, but from contemporary records it is clear that the first king of this dynasty, Amenemhat I, moved its capital to a new city named "Amenemhat-itj-tawy" ("Amenemhat the Seizer of the Two Lands"), more simply called, Itjtawy. The location of Itjtawy has not been discovered yet, but is thought to be near the Fayyum, probably near the royal graveyards at el-Lisht.

The order of its rulers of the Twelfth Dynasty is well known from several sources: two lists recorded at temples in Abydos and one at Saqqara, as well as lists derived from Manetho's work. A recorded date during the reign of Senusret III can be correlated to the Sothic cycle, consequently, many events during this dynasty frequently can be assigned to a specific year.

The Prophecy of Neferti from the period mention  Amenemhat I's mother being from the Elephantine Egyptian nome Ta-Seti. Many scholars in recent years have argued that Amenemhat I's mother was of Nubian origin.

Rulers

Known rulers of the Twelfth Dynasty are as follows:

Amenemhat I  
This dynasty was founded by Amenemhat I, who may have been vizier to the last king of Dynasty XI, Mentuhotep IV. His armies campaigned south as far as the Second Cataract of the Nile and into southern Canaan. He also reestablished diplomatic relations with the Canaanite state of Byblos and Hellenic rulers in the Aegean Sea. He was the father of Senusret I.

Senusret I
Senusret I followed his father's triumphs with an expedition south to the Third Cataract.

Amenemhat II 

Amenemhat II was king during a very peaceful time.

Senusret II
Senusret II also was content to live in peace.

Senusret III
Finding Nubia had grown restive under the previous rulers, Senusret sent punitive expeditions into that land. He also sent an expedition into the Levant. His military campaigns gave birth to a legend of a mighty warrior named Sesostris, a story retold by Manetho, Herodotus, and Diodorus Siculus. Manetho claimed the mythical Sesostris not only subdued the lands as had Senusret I, but also conquered parts of Canaan and had crossed over into Europe to annex Thrace. However, there are no records of the time, either in Egyptian or other contemporary writings that confirm Manetho's additional claims.

Amenemhat III
Senusret's successor Amenemhat III reaffirmed his predecessor's foreign policy. However, after Amenemhat, the energies of this dynasty were largely spent, and the growing troubles of government were left to the dynasty's last ruler, Sobekneferu, to resolve. Amenemhat was remembered for the mortuary temple at Hawara that he built, known to Herodotus, Diodorus, and Strabo as the "Labyrinth". Additionally, under his reign, the marshy Fayyum was first exploited.

Amenemhat IV
Amenemhat IV succeeded his father, Amenemhat III, and ruled for approximately nine years.

Sobekneferu
Sobekneferu, a daughter of Amenemhat III, was left with the unresolved governmental issues that are noted as arising during her father's reign when she succeeded Amenemhat IV, thought to be her brother, half brother, or step brother. Upon his death, she became the heir to the throne because her older sister, Neferuptah, who would have been the next in line to rule, died at an early age. Sobekneferu was the last king of the twelfth dynasty. There is no record of her having an heir. She also had a relatively short reign and the next dynasty began with a shift in succession, possibly to unrelated heirs of Amenemhat IV.

Ancient Egyptian literature refined
It was during the twelfth dynasty that Ancient Egyptian literature was refined. Perhaps the best known work from this period is The Story of Sinuhe, of which several hundred papyrus copies have been recovered. Also written during this dynasty were a number of didactic works, such as the Instructions of Amenemhat and The Tale of the Eloquent Peasant.

Also, the kings of dynasties twelve through eighteen are credited with preserving for posterity some of the most remarkable Egyptian papyri that have survived to today:

 1900 BC – Prisse Papyrus
 1800 BC – Berlin Papyrus
 1800 BC – Moscow Mathematical Papyrus
 1650 BC – Rhind Mathematical Papyrus
 1600 BC – Edwin Smith papyrus
 1550 BC – Ebers papyrus

See also

 Execration texts
 History of Ancient Egypt
 Twelfth Dynasty of Egypt family tree

References

 
States and territories established in the 20th century BC
States and territories disestablished in the 19th century BC
12
20th century BC in Egypt
19th century BC in Egypt
2nd-millennium BC establishments in Egypt
2nd-millennium BC disestablishments in Egypt
12